The 2000 Barnsley Metropolitan Borough Council election took place on 4 May 2000 to elect members of Barnsley Metropolitan Borough Council in South Yorkshire, England. Prior to the election, Labour has suffered a by-election loss in South West and two defections to Independent. One third of the council was up for election and the Labour party stayed in overall control of the council.

Election result

This resulted in the following composition of the council:

Ward results

+/- figures represent changes from the last time these wards were contested.

By-elections between 2000 and 2002

References

2000 English local elections
2000
2000s in South Yorkshire